Ying Kwok (born 24 April 1966) is a Chinese-born table tennis player who represented Australia at the 1992 Summer Olympics.

References

1966 births
Living people
Table tennis players from Guangzhou
Australian female table tennis players
Chinese female table tennis players
Table tennis players at the 1992 Summer Olympics
Olympic table tennis players of Australia
Chinese emigrants to Australia
Naturalised table tennis players